Ian Shaw is an  English record producer and recording engineer, and the owner of the British independent record label Warm Fuzz Records. He is also a member of The Music Producers Guild.

Shaw has engineered and produced over 100 albums.

In 2012, Shaw relocated his studio to a houseboat in Key West, Florida, where he also hosts a weekly indie and unsigned radio show for Pirate Radio Key West on WKYZ.

References

External links
Warm Fuzz Records website
The Guardian

Living people
English record producers
British audio engineers
Year of birth missing (living people)